The 2001–02 season was A.C. Perugia Calcio's fourth consecutive season in top flight of the Italian football league, the Serie A, and the 97th as a football club.

Players

First-team squad

Pre-season and friendlies

Competitions

Overall record

Serie A

League table

Results summary

Results by round

Matches

Coppa Italia

Round of 32

References

A.C. Perugia Calcio seasons
Perugia